Jebel e Ghurab is located in Balochistan, Pakistan. It is a mud volcano.

See also 
 List of volcanoes in Pakistan

External links
 Makran mud volcanos

Volcanoes of Pakistan
Mud volcanoes
Landforms of Balochistan (Pakistan)